Fronde was a   built for the French Navy in the first decade of the 20th century. Completed in 1903, the ship was initially assigned to the Mediterranean Fleet, but was transferred to the Far East the following year. The ship was wrecked during a typhoon in 1908, but was salvaged and returned to service. She participated in the Battle of Penang in 1914, a few months after the beginning of the World War I.

Design and description
The Arquebuse class was designed as a faster version of the preceding . The two vertical triple-expansion steam engines each drove one propeller shaft using steam provided by two du Temple Guyot or Normand boilers. Their crew consisted of four officers and fifty-eight enlisted men.

The main armament of the Arquebuse-class ships consisted of a single  gun forward of the bridge and six  Hotchkiss guns in single mounts, three on each broadside. They were fitted with two single rotating mounts for  torpedo tubes on the centerline, one between the funnels and the other on the stern.

Construction and career

Fronde (Sling) was ordered from Chantiers et Ateliers de la Gironde on 14 November 1900 and the ship was laid down in January 1901 at its shipyard in Bordeaux-Lormont. She was launched on 17 December 1902 and conducted her sea trials during January-March 1903. The ship was commissioned in April and was assigned to the Mediterranean Fleet. Fronde and her sister ship  were used to conduct the navy's first trials with wireless telegraphy. Fronde was transferred to French Indochina in April 1904, along with Mousquet. The two destroyers sailed in company with the protected cruiser .

Fronde was wrecked in the 1906 typhoon that hit Hong Kong; the storm rolled the ship onto the beach, and five of her crew were killed in the accident. The ship was raised and then dry docked in Kowloon to be repaired by the Hong Kong Dock Company. The Fronde Memorial, a granite obelisk, was erected in May 1908 in memory of the five sailors of the Fronde who disappeared in the sinking of their boat near the Torpedo Depot, in Kowloon, Hong Kong, during the 1906 Hong Kong typhoon. Initially erected at the corner of Gascoigne Road and Jordan Road, the monument was later relocated to Hong Kong Cemetery in Happy Valley.

As of 1911, Fronde was serving with the Naval Division of the Far East, based in French Indochina.

World War I
At the start of World War I in August 1914, the Naval Division of the Far East included Fronde, along with the armored cruisers  and Dupleix, D'Iberville, and the destroyers , and Mousquet. The unit was based in Saigon in French Indochina. The destroyers and D'Iberville were initially sent to patrol the Strait of Malacca while the armored cruisers were sent north to join the search for the German East Asia Squadron. D'Iberville and the destroyers conducted patrols in the strait searching for the German unprotected cruiser , which was known to be passing through the area at the time; the French ships failed to locate the German vessel.

Fronde was present in the harbor at Penang in the Dutch East Indies on 27 October 1914, moored alongside her sister Pistolet. The other major Triple Entente ships in the harbor included D'Iberville and the Russian protected cruiser . In the early hours of 28 October, the German light cruiser  entered the harbor to attack the Entente vessels there. In the ensuing Battle of Penang, Emden quickly torpedoed and sank Zhemchug. As Emden turned to leave the harbor, Fronde and D'Iberville opened fire, but their gun crews fired wildly and failed to score any hits on the German raider. The German vessel then encountered Frondes sister Mousquet, which was returning to Penang when the attack began. Emden quickly sank Mousquet and stopped to pick up survivors, but in the meantime, Fronde had gotten underway and attempted to close with Emden. The Germans fled, pursued by Fronde, for about two hours before Emden was able to disappear into a rain squall.

In 1915, Fronde returned to France and served in the Mediterranean for the rest of the war. On 3 July 1918, Fronde collided with the submarine chaser C.43, resulting in the loss of the latter vessel. She was struck from the naval register on 30 October 1919 and sold for scrap in Toulon on 6 May 1920.

References

Bibliography

External links
 

Arquebuse-class destroyers
Ships built in France
1902 ships